Baisha is a town of Leizhou, Guangdong, China. , it has 27 villages under its administration.

References

Towns in Guangdong
Leizhou